Barry Kemp may refer to:

 Barry Kemp (Egyptologist) (born 1940), English archaeologist and Egyptologist
 Barry Kemp (TV producer) (born 1949), television producer, director and writer